Saadiq Faisal Elmi (born 11 November 2000) is a Somali footballer who plays as a forward for Grorud IL and the Somalia national team.

Club career
Elmi began his career with Norwegian club Grorud, making his debut in the 2017 2. divisjon season. In 2020, Elmi was loaned to fellow 2. divisjon club Moss.

International career
On 15 June 2021, Elmi made his debut for Somalia, in a 1–0 friendly loss against Djibouti.

References

2000 births
Living people
Association football defenders
Grorud IL players
Moss FK players
Norwegian Second Division players
Norwegian First Division players
Norwegian footballers
Somalian footballers
Somalia international footballers